Abdolmalek Rigi (also spelt Abdul-Malek Rigi or Abdulmalik Rigi) ( – 20 June 2010) was the leader of Jundallah, a terrorist group based in the Sistan and Balochistan Province of southeast Iran. In 2010, he was captured and executed by the Iranian government.

Early life and education
Born in 1979, Abdolmalek Rigi was from the Rigi tribe who are ethnic Baloch. Prior to founding Jundallah, while a teenager, Rigi was convicted of assault with a knife, for which he served time in prison.

Although lacking any formal secular education, Rigi had been educated at Karachi's Binnori Town seminary, a Sunni Madrasah which was school to many of the Taliban leaders.

Alleged activities

Starting in 2007, there has been considerable controversy over their support and international ties. Jundallah is believed by many experts to be linked to Al-Qaeda. There are also claims that Jundallah has had contact with the U.S. government and receives funding from Baluchi Iranians abroad.

Dan Rather's U.S. cable channel HDnet's television news magazine Dan Rather Reports, interviewed Rigi and showed a video of Rigi personally cutting off his brother in-law's head. In the same interview, Rigi described himself as "an Iranian" and denied that his goal was to form a separate Baluch state. He claimed that his goal was to "improve conditions for ethnic Baluchis", and that his group was "fighting exclusively for the rights of Sunni Muslims in Iran".

According to a former hostage , Rigi never slept in one place for two consecutive nights and did not shake hands with other people without wearing gloves. He was also reported to emulate Al-Zarqawi in his conduct and videos of hostage executions.
The Iranian newspaper Kayhan incorrectly reported on 7 April 2005 that Rigi had been killed in an operation on the border to Afghanistan. A video surfaced on 11 April 2005, showing Rigi alive. Rigi's brother Abdulhamid Rigi accused his brother of working with Americans against Iran. Iranian authorities claimed that Rigi had murdered an Iranian general and carried out terrorist attacks in Iran. These allegations led to his arrest in February 2010.

2010 arrest

There are two conflicting versions of Rigi's arrest. According to the Iranian government, on 23 February 2010, Rigi was aboard a flight from Dubai, United Arab Emirates to Bishkek, Kyrgyzstan, travelling with a forged Afghanistan passport. When the plane was crossing the Persian Gulf, Iranian fighter jets intercepted it. The Iranian jets ordered the pilot to land in Iranian territory and "a number of foreign passengers were forcibly removed." When the plane landed at Bandar Abbas International Airport, Iranian forces identified Rigi and arrested him. After his arrest, Iranian TV showed Rigi, with hands tied, being escorted by four masked Iranian commandos.

Execution
On 20 June 2010, Iranian and international media reported that Rigi had been hanged in Evin Prison in Tehran. The Islamic Republic News Agency stated that the execution was carried out following a decision of the Tehran revolutionary tribunal. It quoted a court statement saying: "The head of the armed counter-revolutionary group in the east of the country was responsible for armed robbery, assassination attempts, armed attacks on the army and police and on ordinary people, and murder." His execution was described as a "severe blow" to Jundullah.

Rigi was buried in Khavaran cemetery in southeast Tehran.

An Iranian drama film, When the Moon Was Full, written and directed by Narges Abyar, was released in 2019. It is based on the story of Rigi's brother and sister-in-law.

See also

 2009 Zahedan explosion
 2010 Zahedan mosque bombings

References

1970s births
2010 deaths
Iranian Sunni Muslims
People executed by Iran by hanging
Terrorism in Iran
Baloch politicians
Sunni Islamists
Iranian criminals
21st-century executions by Iran
Executed Iranian people
Jundallah (Iran)
Iranian rebels
Baloch militants
People from Zahedan
Iranian expatriates in Pakistan
Leaders of Islamic terror groups
Iranian murderers
Inmates of Evin Prison
Jamia Uloom-ul-Islamia alumni